Justine Dupont (born 26 July 1991) is a French professional surfer.

Personal life 
Justine Dupont was born in Bordeaux, France. She began surfing at the age of 11 in Lacanau. She lives between Seignosse, France. and Nazare, Portugal.

Multiple World Champion of the WSL XXL Awards, she has established herself  as the best female big wave surfer in the world since 2019.

Her performance in tow-in surfing allows her to rival with the best male surfers in the discipline.

Stand Up Paddle World Champion and 4X Vice World Champion in 3 different disciplines, she is considered the most versatile female surfer in the world.

Justine is elected Chair of the ISA Athletes' Commission for the 2020 Olympic Games.

She will also be a commentator on french TV during the 2021 olympics.

She launched her Youtube Channel in August 2019 where she frequently posts videos to share her daily life with her fans.

Surfing career 
After being crowned longboard Vice World Champion in 2007 at the age of 15, she obtained again the title of Vice World Champion in 2019.

In 2013, Dupont became the first woman to surf the 15m Belharra in the Northern Basque Country of France.

In 2016, she was again Vice World Champion, this time in the big waves surfing division, and a fourth title of vice world champion in 2017 in the stand up paddle division.

In 2017, she was crowned ISA World Team Surfing Champion with the French team.

Justine is also multiple National and European surfing and longboarding champion. She has accumulated 3 ISA World Team Titles with France (2013 et 2019 Longboard, 2017 Surf).

She has repeatedly surfed waves considered as some of the biggest waves surfed in the world by a woman.

In 2019, she is recognized as a reference in the world of surfing big waves by winning 2 trophies at the XXL Big Waves Awards.

Justine has been elected "Chair" of the ISA Athletes' Commission for the 2020 Olympic Games.

In February 2020, she surfed one the biggest waves ever surfed in the world. She won the first-ever Nazaré Tow Challenge.

In January 2021, in Jaws, Hawaii, she surfed the best big wave ever surfed by a woman.

In 2023, she was one of the first women to compete in “The Eddie”.

Surfing career highlights
 2021
 Winner of WSL Nazare Tow Challenge
 Women XXL Performance of the Year Award
 Women XXL Ride Of The Year Award
 Women XXL Biggest Wave Of The Year Award
 Women Performance of the Year at Mavericks Awards
 2020
Women XXL Performance of the Year Award
Women XXL Ride of the Year Award
Winner of the WSL Nazare Tow Challenge
2019
ISA Stand Up Paddle World Champion
ISA Stand Up Paddle Team World Champion
Women XXL Performance of the Year Award
Women XXL Biggest Wave Award
ISA Longboard World Championship : 2nd
ISA Longboard World Championship  : 1st
Elected European surfer of the year by Eurosima
Heavy Water Award by Surfer Mag
2018
European Longboard Champion
QS Caparica, Portugal : 1st
LQS Espinho, Portugal : 1st
LQS Caparica, Portugal : 2nd
 LQS Biarritz, France : 2nd
2017
 ISA surf team World Champion
 Aloha Cup World Champion with French team
 ISA Stand Up Paddle Surfing World Championship : 2nd
 ISA Stand Up Paddle World Championship with French team : 2nd
 Stand Up Paddle team European Champion
 European Stand Up Paddle Surfing Championships : 2nd
 LQS Boardmasters Jeep Women's Longboard : 1st
 WQS 1000 Caparica Pro, Portugal : 1st
 2016
 WSL Big waves World Championships, Pea'hi, Hawaii : 2nd
 WQS 1000 Central Coast Pro, Avoca Beach, Australia : 1st
 WQS 1500 Azores Airlines Pro, Açores, Portugal : 1st
 2015
 National surf Champion
 National longboard Champion
 2014
 European Longboard Champion
 LQS Vieux Boucau Longboard festival, France : 1st
 2013
 World longboard championships, China : 3rd
 World longboard ISA team Champion with France, Peru
 World longboard  ISA championships, Peru : 3rd
 2012
 WQS 6000 Surf Pro Estoril, Cascais, Portugal : 1st
 2011
 European Surf Champion
 2010
 World longboard ISA championships, Biarritz, France : 3rd
 National surf Champion
 National longboard Champion
 2009
 World longboard ISA championships, Biarritz, France : 3rd
 2008
 European Surf Champion
 National longboard Champion
 2007
 World longboard championships, Biarritz, France : 2nd
 National longboard Champion
 2006
 National longboard Champion

References

External links 
 Official website : https://justinedupont.fr/
 Red Bull Athlete : https://www.redbull.com/int-en/athlete/justine-dupont
 Instagram : https://www.instagram.com/justinedupont33/

1991 births
Living people
French surfers
French female surfers